Mathur  is a subcaste of the Kayastha community in Northern India, with their origins possibly in Mathura.

Mathur in South India 
Sizeable Mathur community is also found in South India, mostly in Hyderabad. They mostly migrated from North India to find placement in administration under Medieval Indian rulers.

Notable people 
 Anurag Mathur, Indian author and journalist 
 Arjun Mathur (born 1981), British-Indian actor
 Ashok Kumar Mathur (born 1943), the former Chief justice of Calcutta High Court, Justice of the Supreme Court of India
 Deepak Mathur (born 1952), Indian molecular and atomic physicist and professor 
 Govind Mathur (born 1959), Indian Judge
 M. V. Mathur or Mukut Vehari Mathur (born 2004), Indian economist and scholar
 Madhur Jaffrey (born 1933), Indian actress, food and travel writer, and television personality
 Mathura Das Mathur (1918–1993), Indian politician from Rajasthan
 Mini Mathur (born 1975), Indian television host, actor and model
 Mukesh Chand Mathur (1923–1976), better known mononymously as Mukesh, Indian playback singer 
 Neil Nitin Mukesh Mathur (born 1982), Indian actor, born to singer Nitin Mukesh, and the grandson of singer Mukesh
 Nitin Mukesh Mathur, Indian playback singer 
 Om Prakash Mathur (born 1952), Indian politician, member of Rajya Sabha from Rajasthan state in India
 Pradeep Mathur (born 1955), Indian politician and former 4 time MLA from the Mathura constituency of Uttar Pradesh
 Pradeep Mathur (scientist) (born 1955), Indian organometallic and cluster chemist and the founder director of the Indian Institute of Technology, Indore
 Prem Mathur Indian pilot, first Indian woman commercial pilot 
 Raghav Mathur (born 1981), known professionally as Raghav, is a Canadian singer-songwriter
 R. K. Mathur or Radha Krishna Mathur (born 1953), Indian IAS officer
 Raj Mathur, founding member of the Indian Linux Users Group, Delhi
 Rajiv Dayal Mathur, Indian Air Marshal, officer in the Indian Air Force
 Sharan Rani Backliwal née Mathur (1929–2008), Indian classical sarod player and music scholar
 Sheila Dhar (1929–2001), Indian author and singer of Kirana gharana
 Shiv Charan Mathur (1927–2009), Indian politician and minister
 Somesh Mathur, Indian singer, composer, songwriter, and music producer
 Surat Mathur (1930–2021), Indian long-distance runner
 Sushma Seth Mathur (born 1936), Indian stage, film and television actress
 Vartika Mathur (1979), Professor in Zoology,  Sri Venkateswara College, University of Delhi

References 

Kayastha
Indian surnames
Toponymic surnames
People from Mathura